The Wisconsin Progressive Party (1934–1946) was a political party that briefly held a dominant role in Wisconsin politics.

History

The Party was the brainchild of Philip La Follette and Robert M. La Follette, Jr., the sons of the famous Wisconsin Governor and Senator Robert M. La Follette, Sr. The party was established in 1934 as an alliance between the longstanding "Progressive" faction of the Republican Party of Wisconsin, led by the La Follette family and their political allies, and certain radical farm and labor groups active in Wisconsin at the time. The party served as a vehicle for Philip La Follette to run for re-election as Governor and for his brother Robert to run for re-election to the United States Senate. Both men were successful in their bids, and the party saw a number of other victories as well in the 1934 and 1936 elections, notably winning several U.S. House seats and a majority of the Wisconsin State Senate and Wisconsin State Assembly in 1936. In 1936 it was informally allied with the New Deal coalition and supported the reelection of President Franklin Roosevelt.

Their grip on power proved short-lived: they succumbed to a united Democratic and Republican front in 1938 which swept most of them out of office, including Philip La Follette. They were further crippled that year by attempting to expand the party to the national level.

Orland Steen Loomis was the last Progressive to be elected Governor of Wisconsin, in the 1942 election. He died, however, before his inauguration as governor. Robert La Follette Jr. held on to his Senate seat until 1946, when the La Follettes decided to disband the party. Robert La Follette ran for re-election that year as a Republican rather than a Progressive, but was defeated in the Republican primary by Joe McCarthy.

During its heyday, the Progressive Party usually did not run candidates in Milwaukee, as there was a tacit agreement with the city's Socialists (known as the "sewer socialists") that progressive third parties should not fight each other, despite strong ideological differences between the two movements (Socialist State Representative George L. Tews during a 1932 debate on unemployment compensation and how to fund it argued for the Socialist bill and against the Progressive substitute, stating that a Progressive was "a Socialist with the brains knocked out"), when both faced opposition from the conservative major parties. During the period from 1939 on, the Progressives and the Socialists of Milwaukee sometimes made common cause in a Farmer-Labor-Progressive Federation, with Socialist legislators caucusing with the minority Progressives. In 1942, Socialist Frank P. Zeidler, later to be elected mayor of Milwaukee, was the nominee on the Progressive party line for State Treasurer of Wisconsin.

The last politician to hold office from the Wisconsin Progressive Party nationally was Merlin Hull, a U.S. Representative from Wisconsin, elected as a Progressive in 1944. (Hull continued to be re-elected on the Republican ticket, and served until his death in 1953.)

Officeholders from the Wisconsin Progressive Party

Federal office

Robert M. La Follette, Jr., Senator, 1935–1946 (served as a Republican 1925–1935)
Thomas Ryum Amlie, U.S. Congressman, 1935–1939
Gerald J. Boileau, U.S. Congressman, 1931–1939
Bernard J. Gehrmann, U.S. Congressman, 1935–1943
Merlin Hull, U.S. Congressman, 1935–1947
Harry Sauthoff, U.S. Congressman, 1935–1939, 1941–1945
George J. Schneider, U.S. Congressman, 1935–1939
Gardner Robert Withrow, U.S. Congressman, 1931–1939

State office

Philip La Follette, Governor of Wisconsin, 1934–1938
Henry Gunderson, Lieutenant Governor of Wisconsin, 1936–1937
Herman Ekern, Lieutenant Governor of Wisconsin, 1937–1938
Theodore Dammann, Secretary of State of Wisconsin, 1935–1938 (served as a Republican 1927–1935)
Orland Steen Loomis, Attorney General of Wisconsin, 1937–1938; elected Governor in 1942 but died before taking office
Solomon Levitan, State Treasurer of Wisconsin, 1937–1938 (served as a Republican 1923–1932)
Herbert J. Steffes, Milwaukee County District Attorney, 1936–1940 (served as a Republican 1940–1944
George Hampel, Wisconsin State Assembly, 1937–1944 (served as a Socialist 1931–1932)
Felix A. Kremer, (Wisconsin State Assembly) 1937–1938
Edward H. Kiefer, Wisconsin State Assembly 1937–1940 (served as a Socialist 1911–1914, 1931–1936)
Ben Rubin, Wisconsin State Assembly, 1937–1942 (served as a Socialist 1931–1932)
Lyall T. Beggs, Wisconsin State Assembly 1941–1947
Chester A. Krohn, Wisconsin State Assembly 1941–1942
Frank D. Sheahan, Wisconsin State Assembly 1941–1942, 1945–1946
Frank Weinheimer, Wisconsin State Assembly 1941–1942
William R. Foley, Wisconsin State Assembly, 1943–1944
Elmer Peterson, Wisconsin State Senate, 1943–1947
Robert McCutchin, Wisconsin State Assembly, 1943–1944 (served as a Republican 1947–1951)
Earl Mullen, Wisconsin State Assembly, 1943–1946 (served as a Republican 1947 –1949)
Laurie E. Carlson, Wisconsin State Assembly 1937–1942
Edwin Myrwyn Rowlands, Wisconsin State Senate, 1935–1937
Michael F. Kresky, Jr., Wisconsin State Senate, 1937–1939
Harold Groves, Wisconsin State Assembly, 1931–1933; Wisconsin State Assembly, 1935–1939
William P. Groves, Wisconsin State Assembly, 1935–1937
Herbert C. Schenck, Wisconsin State Assembly, 1935–1940
Claud H. Larsen, Wisconsin State Assembly, 1939–1940
Harry P. Van Guilder, Wisconsin State Assembly, 1937–1942
William H. Barnes, Wisconsin State Assembly, 1935–1940
George Engebretson, Wisconsin State Senate, 1938 (served as a Republican 1933–1937)
Reno W. Trego, Wisconsin State Assembly, 1937–1940
Otto A. Vogel, Wisconsin State Assembly, 1935–1936 1939–1940 1943–1948
George J. Woerth, Wisconsin State Assembly 1935–1939
James S. Mace, Wisconsin State Assembly 1939–1940
John F. Dittbrender, Wisconsin State Assembly, 1939–1940
Peter A. Hemmy, Wisconsin State Assembly, 1935–1940
Kenneth L. Greenquist, Wisconsin State Senate, 1939–1942
Dougald D. Kennedy, Wisconsin State Assembly, 1937–1941
Martin H. Herzog, Wisconsin State Assembly, 1939–1940
Arthur D. Kelly, Wisconsin State Assembly, 1934–1939 (served as a Republican 1933–1934)
Joseph E. McDermid, Wisconsin State Senate, 1935–1941
Harold Groves, Wisconsin State Senate, 1934–1936
Carl J. Peik, Wisconsin State Assembly, 1939–1940
Herman B. Wegner, Wisconsin State Assembly, 1934–1944 (served as a Socialist 1933–1934)
Oscar S. Paulson, Wisconsin State Senate, 1937–1940
James C. Hanson, Wisconsin State Assembly, 1934–1940 (served as a Republican 1917–1934)
Harry W. Schilling, Wisconsin State Assembly, 1935–1937 (served as a Republican 1947–1951)
Adam F. Poltl, Wisconsin State Assembly, 1935–1936
Fred W. Zantow, Wisconsin State Senate, reelected on the Progressive ticket, 1934; died before he took office (served as a Republican 1931–1934
Bernard E. Brandt, Wisconsin State Assembly, 1935–1936
Hjalmer S. Halvorsen, Wisconsin State Assembly, 1934–1937
Tom Lomsdahl, Wisconsin State Assembly, 1935–1937
John R. Fronek, 1934–1933 (served as a Republican
Arthur A. Hitt, 1934–1939
Ernst J. Hoesly, 1934–1939
Herman J. Severson 1934–1938 (also served as a Republican
Oliver H. Fritz, Wisconsin State Assembly, 1937–1939
Casper D. Waller, Wisconsin State Assembly, 1943–1946
John E. Johnson, Wisconsin State Assembly

Electoral History

Wisconsin State Offices

Wisconsin Federal Offices

See also
 Political party strength in Wisconsin
 La Follette family
 Progressive Era
 Minnesota Farmer–Labor Party
 Third party (United States)

Notes

Further reading
Beck, Elmer A. The Sewer Socialists: A History of the Socialist Party of Wisconsin, 1897–1940. Fennimore, WI: Westburg Associates, 1982.
 Brye, David L. "Wisconsin Scandinavians and Progressivism, 1900-1950." Norwegian-American Studies 27 (1977): 163-193. online
Glad, Paul W. The History of Wisconsin, Volume V: War, A New Era, and Depression, 1914–1940. (Madison: State Historical Society of Wisconsin, 1990).
 Gosnell, Harold F., and Morris H. Cohen. “Progressive Politics: Wisconsin an Example.” American Political Science Review 34#5, (1940), pp. 920–35. online
 Johnson, Roger T. Robert M. LaFollette, Jr. and the Decline of the Progressive Party in Wisconsin (The State Historical Society of Wisconsin, 1964).
 McCoy, Donald R. "The Formation of the Wisconsin Progressive Party in 1934." The Historian 14.1 (1951): 70-90. online
"Progressive Party, Wisconsin." Encyclopedia of American History. Answers Corporation, 2006. Answers.com 26 February 2009. http://www.answers.com/topic/progressive-party-wisconsin

Wisconsin
Political history of Wisconsin
Political parties disestablished in 1946
Political parties established in 1934
Political parties in Wisconsin
1934 establishments in Wisconsin
1946 disestablishments in Wisconsin